Na Kluea is a tambon (sub-district) in Phra Samut Chedi District, Samut Prakan Province, central Thailand.

History
Its name "Na Kluea" means "salt farm" since most of the occupation of the locals in the past was salt farming. The area was originally called "Ban Sakhla" with a long history dating back to the late Sukhothai and early Ayutthaya periods.

The milestone of Ban Sakhla took place in the early Rattanakosin period, corresponds to the King Rama I's reign when the Nine Armies War (1785–86), the last great war between Siam (now Thailand) and Burma (now Myanmar) occurred. In those days, all the able-bodied men in the village were conscripted for military service leaving only the women, children and old folks behind. When a raiding party of Burmese foraging for food threatened the village, the women rallied everyone and fought off the Burmese. From then on, the village was known as "Ban Sao Kla" (village of courage young women), Ban Sao Kla overtime became Ban Sakhla.

Geography
The general condition is a lowland where the sea is flooded. It borders Laem Fa Pha, and Nai Khlong Bang Pla Kot in its district to the east, Laem Fa Pha to the south again, across the canal Khlong Khunrat Phinit Chai Tha Kham in Bang Khun Thian District of Bangkok the west, and Ban Khlong Suan in its district to the north.

Na Kluea has a total area of approximately 32.96 square kilometers.

Administration

Central administration
The entire area of Na Kluea is governed by the Subdistrict Administrative Organization Na Kluea (SAO Na Kluea).

Local administration
It also consists of eight administrative muban (village)

Demography
As of January 2021, Na Kluea had a total population of 11,913 people (5,788 males and 6,125 females). Most of the population settled on the banks of the canals.

Economy
Most of the people are engaged in fishing, and some components of general employment, government service with private company employees.

Places
Wat Sakhla
 Wat Si Khong Kha Ram
 Wat Paowanaram
Sakhla Sutheera Upatham School

It has two child development centres, three primary schools, and four local hospitals.

Transportation
Klong Sapphasamit is the main thoroughfare by waterway. While Suk Sawat–Na Kluea Road is the main thoroughfare by land.

References

External links
 

Tambon of Samut Prakan Province